MacPherson or Macpherson is a surname, meaning "son of the parson" in Scottish Gaelic. Notable people with the surname include:

In sports
Archie Macpherson (born 1937), Scottish football commentator
Bruce MacPherson (field hockey), Canadian field hockey player
Bryden Macpherson, Australian amateur golfer
Duncan MacPherson, ice hockey player
Gus MacPherson, Scottish footballer
Jeff MacPherson, driver in the CART Championship Car series
Michelle MacPherson, Canadian swimmer

In politics
 Ben Macpherson (politician), Scottish politician
 C. B. Macpherson, Canadian academic
Dean Macpherson, South African politician
 Hector Macpherson, Sr. (1875–1970), Canadian-American agricultural economics professor and politician
 Hector Macpherson, Jr. (1918–2015), American farmer and politician
 James Ian Macpherson, British lawyer and politician
 John Alexander MacPherson, Australian politician
 John MacPherson (governor of India), Scottish administrator in India
 John Thomas Macpherson (1872–1921), English politician
 Malcolm MacPherson (1904–1971), Scottish politician
 Murdoch MacPherson, Canadian politician
 Niall Macpherson, 1st Baron Drumalbyn, Scottish politician
 Nicholas Macpherson, British civil servant
 Thomas Macpherson, 1st Baron Macpherson of Drumochter (1888–1965), Scottish politician

In music
Ben Macpherson, Australian musician
Christina Macpherson, Australian behind Waltzing Matilda
Fraser MacPherson, Canadian jazz musician
Greg MacPherson, Canadian singer-songwriter
Graham MacPherson, better known as Suggs, the lead singer of the English band Madness
Jim Macpherson, United States percussionist
Linda Lizotte-MacPherson, Canadian public servant
Sandy MacPherson, Canadian theatre organist
Donald Macpherson BEM was a Scottish bagpipe player, and one of the most successful competitive solo pipers of all time

In literature
James Alan McPherson, American essayist
James Macpherson, Scottish poet
Jay Macpherson, Canadian poet

In show business and news
Daniel MacPherson, Australian actor and television presenter
Don Macpherson, Canadian journalist
Duncan Macpherson, Canadian editorial cartoonist
Elle Macpherson, Australian supermodel and actress
Gordon Macpherson, Founder of Macpherson Menswear – Palmerston North, New Zealand.
Hector Macpherson (1851–1924), Scottish journalist and writer
Malcolm MacPherson (1943–2009), American journalist and author
Myra MacPherson, American journalist and author
Richard MacPherson, American actor

Others
Alexander Macpherson, English architect
Cluny MacPherson, Newfoundland medical doctor and inventor of the gas mask
Colin MacPherson, Scottish Roman Catholic Bishop of Argyll and the Isles from 1968 to 1990
Donald Macpherson (disambiguation), several people
Earle S. MacPherson, the Ford engineer who developed the MacPherson strut in the 1940s
Ewen MacPherson of Cluny, Scottish Jacobite
Fiona Macpherson, FRSE, MAE, Scottish Professor of Philosophy and Director of the Centre for the Study of Perceptual Experience, University of Glasgow
Hector Macpherson (astronomer) (1888–1956), Scottish clergyman and astronomer, son of Hector C. Macpherson
Ian MacPherson, Canadian historian 
Jamie Macpherson, Scottish outlaw, famed for his lament
John Macferson, early 18th-century English pirate
Sir Macpherson Robertson, Australian philanthropist and entrepreneur
Robert Macpherson (disambiguation), multiple people
Colonel Ronald MacPherson or Ranald MacPherson (1817–1869), architect and colonial administrator
Colonel Tommy Macpherson, British army officer
Sir William Macpherson, High Court Judge in England

Fictional characters
Anya MacPherson, fictional character in Degrassi: The Next Generation
Christine "Lady Bird" McPherson, protagonist of Lady Bird

See also
Clan Macpherson, a Scottish clan
The Macpherson Report, into the death of Black British teenage Stephen Lawrence
MacPherson v. Buick Motor Co.
MacPherson strut, a car suspension system
MacPherson, Singapore
Macpherson Stadium (disambiguation)
McPherson (disambiguation)

Scottish surnames
Anglicised Scottish Gaelic-language surnames
Patronymic surnames
Occupational surnames